The 12885 / 12886 Aranyak Express is a short-distance Superfast-type day train run by Indian Railways which connects the city of Kolkata (Shalimar) with Bhojudih.  It operates daily except on Sunday. It travels the 311 km at an average speed of 56–58 km/h. Recently it was extended to Bhojudih (Jharkhand) Junction in Jharkhand State.

The Aranyak Express is hauled by Indian Railways WAM-4 class locomotives.  It is very popular with tourists who wish to travel to Bishnupur, Mukutmanipur, Jhilimili, Susunia Hills or Ayodhya Hills. It has second class seating and general type of coaches. the Indian Railways passes through the major railway stations of Kharagpur, Midnapore, Bishnupur, Bankura, Adra.  Pantry car service is not available on this train. Second class sitting requires advance booking, whereas general coaches can be boarded with a general daily ticket. The Tatkal scheme is available in this train.

Service
 12885 Shalimar (7:45 A.M.) Bhojudih (1:05 P.M. same day)
 12886 Bhojudih (1:25 P.M.) Shalimar (7:00 P.M. same day)

Route & Halts

Traction
It is regularly hauls by a -based WAP-4 / WAP-7 locomotive on its entire journey.

References

Rail transport in Howrah
Railway services introduced in 2000
Named passenger trains of India
Rail transport in West Bengal
Rail transport in Jharkhand
Express trains in India